Lucia Valachová (born 31 December 1997) is a Slovak professional racing cyclist who rides for CyS Akadémia Petera Sagana.

See also
 List of 2016 UCI Women's Teams and riders

References

External links
 

1997 births
Living people
Slovak female cyclists
Place of birth missing (living people)